In biochemistry, non-heme iron proteins describe families of enzymes that utilize iron at the active site but lack heme cofactors.  Iron-sulfur proteins, including those that are enzymes, are not included in this definition.

Some of non-heme iron proteins contain one Fe at their active sites, others have pairs of Fe centers:
Many mono-Fe proteins are alpha-ketoglutarate-dependent hydroxylases.   Major examples are the lipoxygenases, isopenicillin N synthase, protocatechuate 3,4-dioxygenase, deacetoxycephalosporin-C synthase, and aromatic amino acid hydroxylases.

Major diiron enzymes include hemerythrin, some ribonucleotide reductases, some methane monooxygenases, purple acid phosphatases, and ferritin.

References

Enzymes